Paul Moran (born May 16, 1983 in Redwood City, California) is an American soccer player who currently plays for Rochester Thunder in the USL Premier Development League.

Career

Youth and college
Moran grew up in the San Francisco Bay Area playing for the Palo Alto Pumas which won the 2002 Dallas Cup. He graduated from Bellarmine College Prep.  In 2001, he entered Santa Clara University, playing on the men’s soccer team in 2001 and 2002. He transferred to Fresno State University for the 2003 season, then to Fresno Pacific University for the 2004 and 2005 seasons.

During his college years he also spent three seasons with Fresno Fuego in the USL Premier Development League.

Professional
Moran signed with the Montreal Impact of the USL First Division on May 10, 2007, but he was released a month later having never appeared with the first team, and later played four games on loan with the Trois-Rivieres Attak in the Canadian Soccer League.

On March 11, 2008, he signed a one-year contract with an option for a second year with the Minnesota Thunder of the USL First Division.

In 2009 Moran signed with Minnesota's development team, Rochester Thunder, in their inaugural campaign in the USL Premier Development League.

References

External links
 Minnesota Thunder Player Profile

1983 births
Living people
American expatriate sportspeople in Canada
American expatriate soccer players
American soccer players
Canadian Soccer League (1998–present) players
Expatriate soccer players in Canada
Association football defenders
Fresno Fuego players
Fresno State Bulldogs men's soccer players
Minnesota Thunder players
Montreal Impact (1992–2011) players
People from Redwood City, California
Rochester Thunder players
Soccer players from California
Trois-Rivières Attak players
USL First Division players
USL League Two players
Santa Clara Broncos men's soccer players
Fresno Pacific Sunbirds men's soccer players